is a 1961 Japanese Western film directed by Seijun Suzuki in the vein of the Nikkatsu Studio's "borderless action cinema". Hideaki Nitani stars as a singing cowboy and trucker who seeks revenge after his girlfriend is raped and murdered.

Cast
 Hideaki Nitani as Watari
 Izumi Ashikawa as Setsuko Okumura
 Toshio Takahara as Okumura
 Jun Hamamura as president
 Asao Sano as Kuronuma

References

External links
 
 
 Man with a Shotgun  at the Japanese Movie Database

1961 films
1961 Western (genre) films
1960s Japanese-language films
Japanese Western (genre) films
Films directed by Seijun Suzuki
Japanese films about revenge
Rape and revenge films
Nikkatsu films
1960s Japanese films